Platyxanthus is a family of crabs, containing the following genera:
Homalaspis A. Milne-Edwards, 1863
Peloeus Eydoux & Souleyet, 1842
Platyxanthus A. Milne-Edwards, 1863

References

Eriphioidea